Nancy Hogshead-Makar (born April 17, 1962), née Nancy Lynn Hogshead, is an American swimmer who represented the United States at the 1984 Summer Olympics, where she won three gold medals and one silver medal. She is currently the CEO of Champion Women, an organization leading targeted efforts to advocate for equality and accountability in sports. Focus areas include equal play, such as traditional Title IX compliance in athletic departments, sexual harassment, abuse and assault, as well as employment, pregnancy, and LGBT discrimination. In 2012 she began working on legislative changes to assure club and Olympic sports athletes were protected from sexual abuse. In 2018, the Protecting Young Victims from Sexual Abuse and Safe Sport Authorization Act of 2017 was enacted.

Swimming
Hogshead's family is from Iowa. She was born in Iowa City, Iowa, but her family moved to Florida shortly afterwards. When she was 11 years old, her family moved to Jacksonville, Florida, where she would meet coach Randy Reese and be exposed to a team-oriented towards nationals. By age 12 she had qualified for the U.S. Senior Nationals and held the national age-group record in the 200 individual medley. Her first American record was in the 100 yard butterfly in 1977. Hogshead left home to train for the 1980 Olympics while still in high school, with the University of Florida swim team, or FAST. She qualified for the 1980 Summer Olympics in Moscow in the 200 meter butterfly and the 400 meter individual medley, but the American-led boycott kept her home.

Duke University offered Hogshead its first swimming scholarship. There, she was undefeated in dual meets and set a school record in eight different events; one of which stood until 2011. She was a four-time ACC champion and two-time All-American. She was the first woman to be inducted into the Duke Athletics Hall of Fame.

In 1981, Duke University red-shirted Hogshead after she was raped while running between campuses and suffered from PTSD for several months. In the fall of 1982, her coach enticed her to return to the pool by offering her a scholarship and a position on the team if she merely showed up at the competitions.

In January 1983, Hogshead left Duke to train full-time for the 1984 Olympics in California. This time she switched from butterfly to freestyle. She won additional national titles on her way to qualifying for the 1984 US swimming team.

Olympics
At the 1984 Summer Olympics in Los Angeles, she won three gold medals and one silver medal, becoming the most decorated swimmer at the Games. She competed in the first event of the Games, the women's 100m freestyle, where she won in a tie-finish, with American teammate Carrie Steinseifer. They were both awarded gold medals. Hogshead also won golds in the 4 × 100 m freestyle and the 4 × 100 m medley teams, and a silver medal in the 200m individual medley.

Her international career had started in 1977 at the age of 14, when she set her first American record. That year, she was the only American swimmer to be ranked number one in the world in an international event.

Professional career 
Hogshead returned to Duke University to finish her undergraduate degree in 1984. During the summer of 1985, Hogshead interned at the Women's Sports Foundation, at the urging of Donna de Varona. The organization had a strong influence on her career direction and she has worked with the organization for thirty years. She served on the board of trustees from 1987 to 1993 and as its president from 1993 to 1994. She was their Legal Adviser from 2003 to 2010, and was their Senior Director of Advocacy from 2010 to 2014.

In 2014, Hogshead-Makar founded Champion Women.

Legal career
Hogshead is a high-profile advocate of gender equity in sports and a specialist on Title IX of the Education Amendments of 1972. After receiving her J.D. degree from Georgetown University Law Center, Hogshead returned to Jacksonville for private practice at Holland & Knight, LLP. She represented student-athletes and universities in Title IX matters.

From 2001 – 2013, Hogshead-Makar was a tenured professor on the faculty at Florida Coastal School of Law (FCSL) in Jacksonville, where she taught first-year torts and sports law courses, including "Gender Equity in Athletics."

From 2004 – 2012 she was the co-chair of the American Bar Association (ABA) Committee on the Rights of Women.

From 2009 – 2013 she was a board member on The Forum for the Scholarly Study of Intercollegiate Athletics in Higher Education, and served on the editorial board of the Journal of Intercollegiate Sport.

Since 2011, she has served as a board member on the Aspen Institute, "Sport and Society".

She was an advisory board member of the Association of Title IX Administrators "ATIXA" 2011 – 2017

From 2007 – 2010, she served on The Florida Governor's Council on Physical Fitness.  The council provided Governor Crist with a state plan of action to promote physical fitness and nutrition, particularly among children.

She has been an evaluator for missed drug tests by the United States Anti-Doping Agency ("USADA") from 2003 to 2014.

She was a founding member of FCSL's Sports Law Center, offering students a certificate in Sports Law program, from 2004 – 2013.

Hogshead-Makar has testified in Congress numerous times and has served on two Presidential committees on gender in sports.

In 2007, she co-edited the book Equal Play; Title IX and Social Change with economist Andrew Zimbalist.

She has written numerous scholarly and lay articles. She is widely quoted and interviewed on topics related to gender equity, including participation, treatment, scholarships, sexual harassment and assault, preventing trans women from participating in women’s sports, and pregnancy discrimination.

Personal life
Hogshead married Scott Makar, a fellow lawyer at Holland & Knight, on October 10, 1999, and hyphenated his surname to her maiden name. Her husband served as Florida Solicitor General (FSG) upon his appointment by Florida Attorney General Bill McCollum in February 2007.  He is currently a state appellate judge, serving as a member of the Florida First District Court of Appeal.  The couple has a son, Aaron, and twin daughters, Helen Clare and Millicent.

Views on transgender athletes
As a member of the Women's Sports Policy Working Group, Hogshead has spoken out against transgender athletes competing in women's sports. During testimony before the South Carolina legislature, Hogshead said "if [trans women] don't want to go on hormones and they do want to participate as part of girls' and women's sports, surely there are accommodations that we can all agree on that would welcome them into the space but not take the opportunity away from [cisgender] girls and [women]." 

After the transgender swimmer Lia Thomas gained national attention, Hogshead petitioned lawmakers to reject "blanket transgender inclusion or exclusion" in sports and "prioritize fairness for biological women in sport." She further stated, "If Lia's in a competition, that means a woman is not. If Lia wins, that means a woman does not. If Lia goes to the NCAAs, that means a woman does not go to the NCAAs."

Asthma
During the 1984 Olympics, she missed winning a fifth medal by 7/100th of a second, when she suffered a bronchial spasm that led to a diagnosis of asthma. After the initial disbelief, she accepted her condition and learned to monitor and control it. From 1984 to 1996, Hogshead-Makar lectured around the world about asthma management. GlaxoSmithKline sponsored her as she spoke to over 100 groups each year across the US and internationally. Hogshead earned the title of National Spokesperson for the American Lung Association. Hogshead authored the 1990 book, Asthma and Exercise, the first comprehensive book on the topic of asthma and sports. The book tells inspirational stories of athletes who learned to manage their condition.

Awards and honors

1977 AAU Nathan Mallison award as Florida's outstanding amateur athlete.
1984 Come-Back Swimmer of the Year Award from USA Swimming 
1984 Kiphuth Award (given to the best all-around swimmer nationally)
1993 National Association for Sports and Physical Education Hall of Fame  
1994 International Swimming Hall of Fame 
1994 Duke University Sports Hall of Fame 
1995 Florida Sports Hall of Fame 
1988 Jacksonville Sports Hall of Fame 
2002 Honorary Doctorate, Springfield College, (received honorary degree with comedian Bill Cosby). 
2000 Ranked as Florida's 13th greatest athlete of the 20th Century by Sports Illustrated 
2001 International Scholar-Athlete Hall of Fame 
2002 Honorary Doctorate from Springfield College
2003 Yolanda Jackson Give Back Award from the Women's Sports Foundation
2003 Community Woman of the Year Award from Jacksonville University 
2004 International Women's Sports Hall of Fame 
2007 Florida High School Athletic Hall of Fame 
2007 Honor Award from National Association of Collegiate Women Athletics Administrators
2007 Named as one of the most influential people in the 35-year history of Title IX by Sports Illustrated 
2007 Featured, "100 Trailblazers; Great Women Athletes Who Opened Doors for Future Generations" by Richard Lapchick. 
2007  Honor Award Winner, National Association of Collegiate Women Athletics Administrators, (now, Women Leaders In College Sports)  
2008  Academic All-America Hall of Fame from College Sports Information Director's of America (CoSIDA)
2011  Inductee, National Consortium for Academics and Sports 
2011  "Courage Award" National Organization for Women
2012  ESPN Named one of "40 Women Who Will Change Way Sports are Played."  
2012  ESPNW and Women in Cable Telecommunications named one of "Women who have made a significant impact on society after playing high school or college sports. 
2012  "Advocate's Award" from the Alliance of Women Coaches 
2014 International Olympic Committee, Women and Sport Award for the Americas, Monaco  
2014  Babe Didrikson Zaharias Award  
2014  Lifetime Achievement Award, Women in Business 
2015  Shape America, Guiding Women in Sports Award
2015  Pi Beta Phi, International Sorority, Distinguished Alumni
2016  Inductee, Episcopal School of Jacksonville Hall of Honor
2017  Florida Trend Magazine, Listed in Women in Leadership
2018  The Carlile Cup for Lifetime Achievement
2021 Miriam M. Better '72 Stoneman Award

See also
 List of members of the International Swimming Hall of Fame
 List of Duke University people
 List of multiple Olympic gold medalists
 List of Olympic medalists in swimming (women)
 List of World Aquatics Championships medalists in swimming (women)

References

External links
 
 
 
  Nancy Hogshead-Makar – Faculty profile at Florida Coastal School of Law
 Nancy Hogshead-Makar –  Video interview with Miller on Sports Radio
 Jacksonville.com Top 100 Athletes of the Century

1962 births
Living people
American female butterfly swimmers
American female freestyle swimmers
American female medley swimmers
American women lawyers
Duke Blue Devils women's swimmers
Florida lawyers
Georgetown University Law Center alumni
Olympic gold medalists for the United States in swimming
Olympic silver medalists for the United States in swimming
Sportspeople from Iowa City, Iowa
Sportspeople from Jacksonville, Florida
Swimmers at the 1984 Summer Olympics
World Aquatics Championships medalists in swimming
Medalists at the 1984 Summer Olympics
Women's Sports Foundation executives
Holland & Knight people
20th-century American women
21st-century American women